Schwäbisch Gmünd station was opened in 1861 and is located northwest of the city centre of Schwäbisch Gmünd in the German state of Baden-Württemberg. It is on the Rems Railway and is a stop for InterCity trains.

History 

Three options were discussed in 1858 for the route of the Rems Railway through the city and the location of the station:
south of the city
north of the city, but south of the Rems
north of the Rems
 
The first options would have meant passing through parks or the built-up area and the future expansion of the city would have been affected. It was decided that the line would run north of the Rems, which meant that the station would be away from the city centre. It also required the relocation of the Rems river, which would protect the city against flooding.

Responsibility for the design of the station building was assigned in Württemberg in the 1850s and 1860s to the chief engineer responsible for the construction of the rail track, which in the case of Rems Railway was Georg Morlok. The construction followed the neoclassical style of station architecture already in use in Württemberg. The small central bell-tower and the pilasters between the arches on the ground floor are typical of Morlok buildings of this era.

Opening 

The first official trial run on the Schorndorf–Gmünd section of the Rems line was held on 29 June 1861 in a festive atmosphere with great general interest. An official opening trip with guests of honour was held on 18 July 1861 and on 25 July scheduled services began between Stuttgart and Wasseralfingen. The station tracks initially included 25 sets of points, a turntable and a water station with two water cranes. A ticket from Gmünd to Stuttgart cost, in second class, 81 kreuzers and, in third class, 51 kreuzers.

Reconstruction in 1907 
The station was reconstructed between 16 September 1907 and 1910 to handle increasing traffic and the proposed branch line to Göppingen, the Hohenstaufen Railway. This  involved the building of an island platform with an underpass leading to it. A level crossing east of the station was replaced by an underpass. Two stub tracks and a turntable were built for the Hohenstaufen Railway south of the main tracks on the western side of the station building, where there had previously been a goods shed. North of the main tracks, two locomotive sheds were demolished in order to build the new freight yard. The second track of Rems line was being extended from Deinbach block post to Gmünd and this was put into operation on 27 April 1910. After the redevelopment the station tracks had 116 sets of points and two turntables. It became one of the 24 “first class” stations in Württemberg. The Gmünd–Wäschenbeuren section of the Hohenstaufen line was opened on 1 August 1911.

In 1923 an eastern industrial track was created, running from the freight yard to an industrial area north of the Rems Railway, which from 1937 included a subsidiary of Zahnradfabrik Friedrichshafen in Ziegelberg. In 1936, the western industrial track was built south of the main line.

Second World War 
As part of Second World War in late 1944 bomb attacks and gun fire from allied fighter-bombers repeatedly killed and injured people in the station and on the surrounding railway lines and disabled rail services by the destruction of railway track and vehicles. A bomb explosion on 19 April 1945 destroyed a railway bridge to the west of the station and broke the connection on the Rems Railway to Stuttgart.

Post-war period 
North of the passenger station the freight yard was served by approximately 14,900 freight wagons in 1959. A few years ago it was shut down and the tracks are currently being demolished.

As part of the horticultural show of 2014 in Schwäbisch Gmünd, the station and the surrounding area have been redesigned.

Services 
The station has two platforms, connected by an underpass. The underpass has been equipped with lifts in 2014.

Next to the entrance building is platform track 1, which is a through track, on the island platform are track 2 (a through track), track 3 (which is a terminating track from Stuttgart) and the seldom-used platform 4.

The station building built in 1861 is still used as such. Today the facilities for the public are a ticket office, a kiosk, a snack bar and a restaurant.

Operations 

Every two hours inter-city services operated by DB Fernverkehr on the Karlsruhe–Stuttgart–Nuremberg route stop at the station. Regional services operated by the DB Regio consist of a pair of Interregio-Express services each day between Aalen and Stuttgart, hourly Regional-Express services on the same route with extra services in peak periods and some Regionalbahn services between Schwäbisch Gmünd and Schorndorf.
  Karlsruhe – Stuttgart – Schwäbisch Gmünd – Aalen – Nuremberg
  Stuttgart – Schorndorf – Schwäbisch Gmünd – Aalen
  Stuttgart – Waiblingen – Schorndorf – Schwäbisch Gmünd – Aalen – Ellwangen – Crailsheim

Connections 
West of the station building is the city's central bus station, in the forecourt there are a taxi rank, parking spaces and bicycle stands; further east is a park-and-ride car park.

Notes

References

External links 

Railway stations in Baden-Württemberg
Railway stations in Germany opened in 1861
19th-century establishments in Württemberg